Samuel Alabi Borquaye (born 6 May 2000) is a Ghanaian footballer who plays as a midfielder for Israeli club Ashdod on loan from the Swiss club Luzern.

Career
On 12 June 2020, Alabi signed for the Israeli Premier League club in Ashdod.

On 22 September 2020 Alabi signed in FC Luzern for 1 Million $.

On 15 September 2022, Alabi was loaned back to Ashdod for the 2022–23 season.

References

External links
 
 

2000 births
Living people
Ghanaian footballers
Association football midfielders
Dreams F.C. (Ghana) players
F.C. Ashdod players
FC Luzern players
Israeli Premier League players
Swiss Super League players
Swiss Promotion League players
Swiss 1. Liga (football) players
Ghanaian expatriate footballers
Expatriate footballers in Israel
Ghanaian expatriate sportspeople in Israel
Expatriate footballers in Switzerland
Ghanaian expatriate sportspeople in Switzerland